Rambler is the second album by Bill Frisell to be released on the ECM label. It was released in 1985 and features performances by Frisell, trumpeter Kenny Wheeler, tuba player Bob Stewart, bass guitarist Jerome Harris and drummer Paul Motian.

Reception
The AllMusic review by Scott Yanow awarded the album 4½ stars, stating, "This relatively early set from Bill Frisell is a fine showcase for the utterly unique guitarist. Frisell has the ability to play nearly any extroverted style of music and his humor (check out the date's "Music I Heard") is rarely far below the surface. This particular quintet (with trumpeter Kenny Wheeler, tuba player Bob Stewart, electric bassist Jerome Harris and drummer Paul Motian) is not exactly short of original personalities and their outing (featuring seven Frisell compositions) is one of the most lively of all the ones in the ECM catalog."

Track listing
All compositions by Bill Frisell.

 "Tone" – 8:00
 "Music I Heard" – 4:49
 "Rambler" – 8:20
 "When We Go" – 5:19
 "Resistor" – 5:49
 "Strange Meeting" – 7:05
 "Wizard of Odds" – 6:19

Personnel
Bill Frisell – guitar, guitar synthesizer
Kenny Wheeler – trumpet, cornet and fluegelhorn
Bob Stewart – tuba
Jerome Harris – electric bass
Paul Motian – drums

References 

1985 albums
Bill Frisell albums
Albums produced by Manfred Eicher
ECM Records albums